Loricariichthys stuebelii is a species of catfish in the family Loricariidae. It is native to South America, where it occurs in the Huallaga River basin in the upper Amazon River drainage in Peru. The species reaches  in standard length and is believed to be a facultative air-breather.

References 

Loricariini
Taxa named by Franz Steindachner
 Taxobox binomials not recognized by IUCN